Ladislav Almási (born 6 March 1999) is a Slovak footballer who plays for Czech club Baník Ostrava as a forward.

Club career

FK Senica
Almási made his Fortuna Liga debut for Senica against ViOn Zlaté Moravce on 1 March 2016.

Akhmat Grozny
On 20 January 2021, he joined Russian Premier League club FC Akhmat Grozny on loan until the end of the 2020–21 season, with an option to purchase.

International career
He made his debut for the Slovakia national football team under Štefan Tarkovič on 8 October 2021 in a World Cup qualifier against Russia. He came on after 79 minutes of play to replace Lukáš Haraslín with the final score of 1-0 already set, through a first-half own goal by Milan Škriniar. Following Tarkovič's dismissal and arrival of Francesco Calzona, Almási was initially excluded of nominations, mainly due to an injury and subsequent low recent play-time. In December 2022, Almási was called-up by Calzona for senior national team prospective players' training camp at NTC Senec.

Personal life
Almási was born in Bratislava and is a member of the Hungarian ethnic minority in Slovakia.

References

External links
 FK Senica official club profile 
  (archive)
  
 Futbalnet Profile 

1999 births
Living people
Slovak people of Hungarian descent
Footballers from Bratislava
Slovak footballers
Slovak expatriate footballers
Slovakia youth international footballers
Slovakia under-21 international footballers
Slovakia international footballers
Association football forwards
FK Senica players
FC DAC 1904 Dunajská Streda players
FC ŠTK 1914 Šamorín players
FC Petržalka players
MFK Ružomberok players
FC Akhmat Grozny players
FC Baník Ostrava players
Slovak Super Liga players
2. Liga (Slovakia) players
Russian Premier League players
Czech First League players
Expatriate footballers in Russia
Slovak expatriate sportspeople in Russia
Expatriate footballers in the Czech Republic
Slovak expatriate sportspeople in the Czech Republic